Petrika Ionesco (born Petrică Ionescu; 13 October 1946) is a Romanian-born French stage director, scenic designer and playwright.

Life and career
In 1970 he graduated from the "Ion Luca Caragiale" Theatrical Arts Academy in Bucharest, and in the same year he defected while touring Italy.

After living in France for about a year, he went to the USA in 1971 (at the invitation of stage director Ellen Stewart), and then hitchhiked around the world before returning to Paris. There he met Fernando Arrabal, who invited him to London to stage his play Et ils passèrent des menottes aux fleurs ("And They Put Handcuffs on the Flowers").

He has staged plays in France, Great Britain, Germany, Ireland, Romania, Switzerland, etc. Although he mainly works for the theatre stage, he has also staged shows at Disneyland.

He became a French citizen in 1976.

Filmography
Cinderella (2007), stage design

Plays
L’Atlantide
L’enfance de Vladimir Kobalt

References

External links
 Official site
 Dupa acest Oedip ar trebui sa se faca un film, 14 October 2003, Virgil Oprina, Ziarul de Duminică 

1946 births
Romanian theatre directors
French theatre directors
Romanian scenic designers
French scenic designers
Romanian expatriates in France
Romanian defectors
Living people